Goldfields is a rural locality in the Southern Downs Region, Queensland, Australia.

Geography 
The terrain is undulating and predominantly used for grazing cattle. A small area in the north of the locality is part of the Durikai State Forest.

History 
The locality was named and bounded on 15 December 2000.

Education 
There are no schools in Goldfields. The nearest primary school is Amiens State School in neighbouring Amiens to the south-east and Pozieres State School in Pozieres to the east. The nearest secondary school is Stanthorpe State High School in Stanthorpe to the south-east.

References 

Southern Downs Region
Localities in Queensland